Brigham Roland Smoot (June 15, 1869 – December 16, 1946) was a missionary of the Church of Jesus Christ of Latter-day Saints (LDS Church) and an executive of the Utah-Idaho Sugar Company. He was one of the two first Mormon missionaries to preach in Tonga and served as president of the LDS Church's Tongan mission from July 1891 to October 1892. Smoot was the son of Abraham O. Smoot and the brother of Reed Smoot.

Early life and family
Brigham Smoot was born on June 15, 1869, in Salt Lake City, Utah Territory, to Abraham O. Smoot and Anne K. Mauritsen, his fifth of six plural wives. Brigham's brother Reed Smoot went on to be a businessman and an apostle in the LDS Church before being elected by the state legislature as United States Senator from Utah in 1903. Smoot was baptized into the LDS Church on June 17, 1877. His family moved to the frontier town of Provo, Utah Territory, when his father was called by Brigham Young to establish a church stake there. Brigham Smoot graduated from Brigham Young Academy in Provo, a school for which his father had been the major financial backer.

Missionary work
In June 1889, Brigham Smoot was sent at the age of 20 on a mission for the LDS Church to Samoa. Smoot sailed there and was assigned as a companion to Edward J. Wood. During his second day in Samoa, Smoot joined Wood and the other missionaries for a bath in the ocean. While wading in the ocean, Smoot slipped into a deep hole in the reef. After being dead for several minutes, Smoot was revived by Butler by what they described as a priesthood blessing.

Sent to open a mission in July 1891, Smoot and Alva J. Butler became the first LDS missionaries in Tonga. On July 16, 1891, they met with King George Tupou I, who granted them permission to proselyte in Tonga. The first proselyting session in Tonga was held by Smoot and Butler on August 1, 1881. On November 22, 1881 Smoot and Butler leased the first piece of land for the LDS Church. On January 24, 1892 the first official LDS church meeting was conducted by Smoot and Butler in the mission home. Smoot dedicated the mission home on May 15, 1892. He later became the president of the Tongan Mission of the LDS Church from July 14, 1891 to October 24, 1892. He returned to Utah in December 1892.

Career
After returning from his mission, Brigham Smoot graduated with a degree in chemical engineering from Lehigh University in Bethlehem, Pennsylvania, in 1898. After graduation, Smoot returned to Utah and worked for the mining industry in Eureka. On June 20, 1900, he married Margaret Annella Nesbit in Provo, Utah. Roland Nesbit Smoot was born on May 7, 1901. A year later, he had a daughter named Annella Kerstina Smoot. Beginning in 1901, he worked as a supervisor for the Utah-Idaho Sugar Company, which processed sugar cane. Smoot was eventually promoted to general superintendent.

After he retired in 1937, he moved to Pasadena, California. He lived there until his death on December 16, 1946.

Footnotes

References

External links
Brigham Smoot family papers, Vault MSS 3315, L. Tom Perry Special Collections, Harold B. Lee Library, Brigham Young University
Brigham Smoot journals and letter, Vault MSS 3315 Series 1, L. Tom Perry Special Collections, Harold B. Lee Library, Brigham Young University

1869 births
1946 deaths
19th-century Mormon missionaries
American chemical engineers
American leaders of the Church of Jesus Christ of Latter-day Saints
American Mormon missionaries in Samoa
American Mormon missionaries in Tonga
Brigham Young Academy alumni
Lehigh University alumni
Mission presidents (LDS Church)
People from Provo, Utah
Smoot–Rowlett family
Latter Day Saints from Utah
Latter Day Saints from Pennsylvania
Latter Day Saints from California
Harold B. Lee Library-related 19th century articles